Paula Lambert is an Irish puppeteer, most famously she is the puppeteer of Bosco. She was a member of the Lambert Puppet Theatre in Monkstown, County Dublin.

Biography
Paula Lambert is the youngest daughter of puppeteers Eugene and Mai Lambert, one of the couple's ten children. From childhood, Lambert was a puppeteer with the family's Lambert Puppet Theatre, which was founded in 1972, and on their first television show, Wanderly Wagon. On the Wanderly Wagon Lambert was one of the mice who lived in the wallpaper and later one of the squirrels who lived in the loft. She was also on the spin-off series Fortycoats & Co. as Spooky the Cat.

Lambert took over from her sister Miriam as the puppeteer and voice of Bosco in 1981. After the cancellation of the television show, Lambert continued to tour Bosco around Ireland with the Paula Lambert Puppet Theatre. 2019 marked 40 years of Lambert's Bosco tours.

Lambert was in a relationship with Michael Monaghan, a former RTÉ producer and director, until his death in 2009. They have one child, Johnny. Johnny has joined the Paula Lambert Puppet Theatre as a third generation puppeteer.

References

External links
 
Lambert's interview with Ray D'Arcy in 2018 on RTÉ
Lambert's interview about Bosco on the podcast Fascinated
Lambert's interview about Bosco on the podcast Juvenalia

People from Monkstown, County Dublin
Puppeteers
Year of birth missing (living people)
Living people
Television personalities from Dublin (city)
Irish theatre people
20th-century Irish women
21st-century Irish women